Teatro Ziembinski is a theatre in Rio de Janeiro, Brazil. It was named after Zbigniew Ziembinski, who incidentally was director of the Teatro Serrador in the 1960s.

References

Theatres in Rio de Janeiro (city)